Asociación Deportiva Isidro Metapán, also known simply as Isidro Metapán, is a Salvadoran sports club based in Metapán, Santa Ana, El Salvador.

It is best known for its professional football team, which plays in the Primera División, the top tier of the El Salvador football league system, and is one of the most successful club in El Salvador football history, having won 10 national titles.

Isidro Metapán was founded in 2000, after the merger of Isidro Menéndez and Metapán FC. The club had its period of greatest success in the 2000s.

Since the formation of the Apertura/Clausura, A.D. Isidro Metapán has been the dominant club in El Salvador football, winning ten championships.  Their traditional local rivals are FAS.

Since the beginning of the 2000–01 season, A.D. Isidro Metapán has played its home games at the Estadio Jorge Calero Suárez. The team colours are blue, red and white, and the team crest shows the white and blue and the Jaguar. The club has other departments in basketball, and others.

History

Present history
In 2000, Metapán FC and Isidro Menéndez, two Second Division strugglers, chose to merge. In 2001, the newly born club won promotion to the Primera División with a 3–2 playoff win over Jocoro FC.

The club quickly consolidated their position as a mid-table side, and starting in Apertura 2004 began making title pushes. 
They qualified for the playoffs for the first time that year by defeating Luis Ángel Firpo in a fourth place playoff.  In Apertura 2005, they finished the regular atop the table, defeated Once Municipal in the semi-finals, and only fell short of their first title after a 2–0 extra time loss to Vista Hermosa.

In Clausura 2007, the club finally bettered that result, taking home their first ever championship with a 1–0 extra time win over Luis Ángel Firpo.  That qualified the team for the CONCACAF Champions League for the very first time, although they did not get past the preliminary rounds.

Over the next several years, Isidro Metapán began to surpass the traditional powers of Salvadoran football (FAS, Firpo, Alianza, and Águila).  They won their second title in a penalty shootout over Chalatenango in Apertura 2008, then defended their crown in Clausura 2009 with a 1–0 win over Luis Ángel Firpo. Alexander Amaya scored the winner in the 58th minute.

After a near miss in the Apertura 2009, Isidro returned to the top for the third time in four seasons by winning the championship of Clausura 2010. Léster Blanco and Paolo Suárez each scored in a 3–2 win over Águila. 
In each season from 2007 to 2010, the club had won the title at least once.  They would win it for a fourth time in five in Apertura 2010, beating Alianza 4–3 in a penalty shootout.

2011–2012 was the most successful season in club history.  It started in the summer, in the CONCACAF Champions League.  Metapan qualified for the group stages, and a 2–0 win over Mexican team Santos Laguna allowed them to qualify out of the groups into the quarterfinals for the first time.  Although UNAM Pumas eliminated them at that stage, it had still been a very successful run.

Meanwhile, domestically, Metapán won a sixth title in eight years with a 1–0 victory over Once Municipal the only goal coming from Paolo Suárez in the 51st minute.

They narrowly missed a repeat that spring in the Clausura, losing 2–1 to Áquila in the championship match.  However, they recovered to win a seventh championship in nine years, defeating Alianza in extra time to win the Apertura 2012.  For a moment it looked like the hero would be Metapán's top goal scorer Nicolás Muñoz, who scored from a free kick in extra time. However Sean Fraser of Alianza equalized with a header, forcing the match into penalties.  After a dramatic shootout, Isidro Metapán won 6–5.

They won their 8th title in Apertura 2013, beating FAS 1–0 on a goal from Andrés Flores in the 85th minute.

On 25 May 2014 Isidro Metapán won the Primera División title for the ninth time in the club history, defeating Dragón on penalties 6–5.

Title number 10 came in Apertura 2014, as Metapán defeated Águila in penalties 3–2. Once again, Nicolás Muñoz played a very important role in taking the match to penalties with an extra time goal.

Sponsorship

Shirt sponsors and manufacturers

Home stadiums
The team currently plays in the Estadio Jorge Calero Suárez. The stadium is located in Metapán, Santa Ana. A new stadium is currently being built and is expected to be finished in the year 2015 or 2016
 Estadio Jorge Calero Suárez (2000–)
 Complejo Deportivo Metapán

New Stadium
The 2015–16 season was to have been the last season at the Estadio Jorge Calero Suárez, with the club moving to their new 10,000-seater stadium Complejo Deportivo Metapán in time for the 2017–18 season. However, due to the club being in financial crisis, work on the new stadium has since stopped.

Honours
Primera División
Champions (10): Clausura 2007, Apertura 2008, Clausura 2009, Clausura 2010, Apertura 2010, Apertura 2011, Apertura 2012, Apertura 2013, Clausura 2014, Apertura 2014
Liga de Ascenso
Champions (1): 2000–01

Performance in International competitions
Copa Interclubes UNCAF: 1 appearance
Best: First Round 2007
2007: First Round

CONCACAF Champions League: 7 appearances
Best: Quarter-final 2011–12
2008–09: Preliminary Round
2009–10: Group stage
2010–11: Preliminary Round
2011–12: Quarter-final
2012–13: Group stage
2013–14: Group stage
2014–15: Group stage
2015–16: Group stage

Copa Mesoamericana: 1 appearance
Best: Runner-up 2011
2011: Runner-up

Records and statistics

Metapan have won 10 domestic trophies, including the league ten times. From 2009 to 2011, the club won five successive league titles, equalling the all-time record.

Isidro Metapan's name is attached to a number of Primera division and CONCACAF records:

 The Isidro Metapan player with the most appearances is Hector Omar Mejia, with 518 in all competitions.
 The Isidro Metapan player with the most goals is Williams Reyes, with 77 in all competitions

Current squad
As of 5 February 2023

Players with dual citizenship
   Gerber Chavez

Out on loan

In

Out

Current coaching staff
As of 17 August 2021.

Reserve squad

As of 2018:

Management

List of notable players

List of retired numbers

15 – Retired in 2011 in recognition of goalkeeper Álvaro Misael Alfaro. Alfaro was a major player for Metapán who suffered a neck injury which forced him to retire from the game. In 2011, the number was brought out of retirement and given to back-up goalkeeper.

18 – Retired in 2011 in recognition of midfielder Nelson Rivera. Rivera was shot in the head and died after unknown gunmen attacked the car he was traveling in. The number was brought out of retirement in 2012.

20 – Retired in 2015 in recognition of midfielder Héctor Mejía. Mejía was a long serving and major player for Metapán, he participated in all 10 of Metapán title victories. He retired as Metapán most decorated and most capped player in their history.

One-club men

List of coaches
Isidro Metapán has had 12 permanent managers and 3 temporary manager since the club was formed after the merger of Metapán FC and Isidro Menéndez FC. Edwin Portillo holds the record for most championships won with the club with 7, longest-serving manager in terms of time consecutively of time with 8 years between 2006 and 2013, and most tenures as coach of Metapán with 6. Jorge Rodríguez the manager holds the record with most consecutive titles with three.
This list also includes the coaches who coached CESSA/Metapán FC and Isidro Menéndez

Other departments

Football

Reserve team
The reserve team serves mainly as the final stepping stone for promising young players under the age of 21 before being promoted to the main team. The second team is coached by TBD. the team played in the Primera División Reserves, their greatest successes was winning the Reserve championships four times in Apertura 2013, Clausura 2014, Clausura 2015, Clausura 2018.

Junior teams
The youth team (under 17 and under 15) has produced some of El Salvador's top football players, including TBD and TBD.

Women's team
The women's first team, which is led by head coach Cristian Zañas, features several members of the El Salvador national ladies team. Their greatest successes was  winning the 2021 Clausura 3-2 penalties.

Other sports
Isidro Metapan has other departments for a variety of sports.

Basketball
AD Isidro Metapan Básquetbol Club was founded in 2015 and play Liga Mayor de Baloncesto (LMB) which is the highest level in El Salvador league tier. the club is led by head coach TBD, the club features several key members including Nigerian Deji Akindele and TBD. Their greatest successes were winning the 2015 Clausura

Notable players: Nigerian Deji Akindele, Panamanian Jonathan King, Nicaraguan Bartel López,  
Past coaches: Darwin Veliz (2017)

References

External links
 Municipal news of Metapán
 http://www.geocities.com/maradona1o/ (Archived 2009-10-24)
 https://web.archive.org/web/20110720163252/http://archive.laprensa.com.sv/20070904/latribuna/Cronologia-1-Trib090120072-3.pdf
 https://web.archive.org/web/20110929142108/http://archive.laprensa.com.sv/20070904/latribuna/Cronologia-2-Trib090120072-3.pdf
 https://web.archive.org/web/20110720163413/http://archive.laprensa.com.sv/20070904/latribuna/Equipoideal-Trib090120078-9.pdf
 https://web.archive.org/web/20071128005453/http://archive.laprensa.com.sv/20070901/latribuna/859436.asp
 https://web.archive.org/web/20110929142152/http://archive.laprensa.com.sv/20070901/latribuna/861199.asp
 http://archive.laprensa.com.sv/20070901/latribuna/Historia-Trib090120076-7.pdf
 https://web.archive.org/web/20110720163615/http://archive.laprensa.com.sv/20070901/latribuna/859452.asp
 https://web.archive.org/web/20110720163631/http://archive.laprensa.com.sv/20070901/latribuna/859934.asp
 Calero
 https://web.archive.org/web/20111025203600/http://www.laprensagrafica.com/deportes/futbol-nacional/226210-camino-a-ser-un-club.html

Association football clubs established in 2000
Football clubs in El Salvador
2000 establishments in El Salvador
Metapán